With the amount of bilinguals increasing worldwide, psycholinguists have begun to look at how the brain represents multiple languages. The mental lexicon is a focus of research on differences between monolingual and multilingual brains.

Research during past decades shows that bilingual brains have special neural connections.  Whether said connections constitute a distinct bilingual brain structure is still under study. The mode of basic lexical representations of bilingualism has also been debated.

Development

Lexical development
Lexical development does not occur in isolation.  Children learn pronunciations, meanings and how to use words from interactions with their parents and environment (i.e. social interactions).  The process moves from using words in particular situation to the understanding that words can be used to refer to different instances of conceptual categories, which means objects, or action words can be used in similar situations.  After this step, children increase their vocabulary in categories like colour, animals, or food, and learn to add prefixes and suffixes to and meaning to words.  Once children enter school, they develop words into reading and written aspects.  Knowledge will be developed by reading and exposure to various written context.

Lexical development in bilingual children

For bilingual children who grow up in a bilingual environment, how their language developed through childhood influences the lexical size of both languages.  Researchers showed that the basic process is same as with monolinguals, and bilingual children tend to learn the languages as two monolinguals.  The growth of both languages' lexicon is the same with the growth of the lexicon for monolingual.  Older children do transfer more than younger children.  Also in this step of learning words, the vocabulary size positively related to the exposure time in that language.  This will stop until a certain amount of vocabulary of the language is reached.  Semantic tasks for preschool children with predominantly Spanish-speaking, predominantly English-speaking and bilingual showed that these three groups are different from each other.  Bilinguals perform best on expressive function for both Spanish and English as predominantly-speaking children but performed differently in each language, which means they do not mirror performance in Spanish and English.  They are better on some in English, better on others in Spanish. The ability of learning one language does not influence the ability of learning the other one for bilinguals.

Lexical development in children who learn their second language when their first language is already developed is different from that of children who grow up in a bilingual environment (i.e. simultaneous bilingualism).  The beginning step of learning words in the second language is translation, or learning the definitions.  This is different from how they learned their first language which involves inputting the information of semantic and formal entities together.  When accessing these newly learned words, the basic language semantic system will be activated, which means when a second language word is activated, the basic language word with the same meaning is also activated.  It can be said that learners are still thinking in basic language but try to represent in second language by translation as more semantic and syntax knowledge is learned for the second language.  This new language is gradually independent from the basic language.  Learners began to access the language without translation with semantic knowledge for that language.  As learns gain more and more exposure to the new language, they will complete the development of second language when they can access and use the language from the concept, which can be said to be thinking in that language directly.

Process and access
With years of researches, how languages are stored and processed by bilinguals is still a main theme that many psycholinguists.  One main topic is that bilinguals possess one or two internal lexicons, and even more with three stores.  One for each language and the third one is for corresponding two languages.  Reaction time of recognizing words in different languages is the most used method to figure out how our lexicon been activated.  Researches in 1980s by Soares and Grosjean on English-Portuguese bilingual had two main findings.  One is that although bilingual can access real words in English as quickly as English monolinguals, but they are slower at responding to non-words.  The other finding is that bilingual took longer to access code-switched words than they did base-language words in the monolingual mode.  These two findings can be seen as the evidence for more than one lexicon are existed in bilinguals' brains.  As technology develops, functional magnetic resonance imaging (fMRI) is also used to study how brain activity is different in bilinguals' brain when both languages are interacting.  Imaging studies have yielded that specific brain areas are involved in bilingual switching, which means this part of the brain can be said as the "third lexicon", the interconnected part of two lexicons for each language, where stores the guest words. Other research suggests only one combined lexicon exists.

See also
 Language acquisition

References

Bilingualism